Kenneth Leonard Jacobs (born 7 May 1959) is a South African politician and doctor currently serving as the Chairperson of the Portfolio Committee on Health in the National Assembly of South Africa since 2021. He has been a Member of Parliament since 2019. Jacobs is a member of the African National Congress.

Background
Jacobs was born on 7 May 1959. He holds a Bachelor of Science (BSc) degree from the University of the Western Cape, a Bachelor of Medical Sciences Honours degree (BSc (Med) Hons) from the University of Cape Town, a Bachelor of Medicine and Bachelor of Surgery (MBChB) degree and a Master of Medicine (MMed)degree in Family Medicine from the University of Stellenbosch as well as a Master of Science (MSc) degree in Sports Medicine from the University of Pretoria.

Jacobs is a former member of the provincial executive committee (PEC) of the African National Congress in the Western Cape.

Parliamentary career
In 2019 Jacobs stood for election to the South African National Assembly as 5th on the ANC's Western Cape list of parliamentary candidates. At the election, he won a seat in parliament. Upon election, he became a member of the Portfolio Committee on Health.

In August 2021, Jacobs was elected Chairperson of the Portfolio Committee on Health. Jacobs replaced Sibongiseni Dhlomo, who was appointed Deputy Minister of Health.

References

External links

Living people
1959 births
Coloured South African people
People from the Western Cape
Members of the National Assembly of South Africa
Stellenbosch University alumni
University of the Western Cape alumni
University of Cape Town alumni
University of Pretoria alumni
African National Congress politicians